Uroš Filipović (born 22 April 1998) is a Serbian footballer, who plays for Radnički Pirot.

Club career

Radnički Pirot
Born in Belgrade, Filipović passed Red Star Belgrade youth categories, playing as a member of the club for 8 years until the end of 2015–16 season. He was elected in youth ranks under Football Association of Belgrade in his early years. Next he left Red Star Belgrade, Filipović completed his youth career playing with Radnički Pirot.

In summer 2016, Filipović joined Radnički Pirot. After he spent the first half-season playing with youth team, Filipović joined the first team of the club at the beginning of 2017 under coach Marjan Živković. He made his senior debut in 19 fixture away match of the 2016–17 Serbian First League season, played against Mačva Šabac on 25 March 2017. He also appeared several times in the rest of a season. Filipović scored his first goal for Radnički Pirot in 3–1 victory over Jagodina on 15 October 2017. Scoring from the middle of the field in 5th second of the game, Filipović scored the one of fastest goals in the Serbian football. He also scored in 7–2 cup defeat against Napredak Kruševac on 25 October 2017, from penalty kick.

Style of play
During the time he spent in youth ranks, Filipović moulded himself as a utility player. He has started playing football as a forward, but moving through the youth categories, he changed his position a lot. Due to creative abilities, he gradually moved to the middle of the field. In last years playing with Red Star Belgrade youth teams, Filipović was mostly used as a defensive midfielder or creative playmaker, also having a role as a left-back. Finally, he started his senior career at the same position, playing with Radnički Pirot in the Serbian First League. Filipović has confirmed as a long ranger, and he is also an accurate penalty taker.

Career statistics

Club

References

1998 births
Living people
Footballers from Belgrade
Association football midfielders
Association football utility players
Serbian footballers
FK Radnički Pirot players
Serbian First League players